John Ernest Dermot Campbell DL (20 January 1898 – 23 January 1945) was a Northern Irish businessman and Ulster Unionist Member of Parliament in both United Kingdom and Northern Ireland Parliaments. He was killed during the Second World War in a plane crash.

Born in Randalstown, son of R. Garrett Campbell, Campbell was educated at Lockers Park School, Wellington College, and the Royal Military Academy, Woolwich. He joined the Royal Artillery late in World War I, serving in Palestine from 1918 to 1919, retiring as Lieutenant.

After his army service Campbell turned his attention to business and politics in Northern Ireland. He became the managing director of two flax spinning companies; Henry Campbell and Co., and Messrs Laverty and Co. Ltd and was appointed Deputy Flax Controller for Northern Ireland in 1940.

An Ulster Unionist, he was appointed as Chairman of Carrickfergus Urban District Council. In a by-election of 11 February 1943 he was elected as Member of the United Kingdom Parliament for Antrim, succeeding his father-in-law Sir Joseph McConnell who had died the previous year. On 26 August 1943 in a byelection following the resignation of John Fawcett Gordon, he was elected to the Northern Ireland Parliament as member for Carrick. He held these posts until death aged 46 in 1945 when his plane crashed in the Adriatic Sea during a parliamentary fact finding visit to Italy.

He was also a Deputy Lieutenant for Belfast and was appointed High Sheriff of Antrim in 1942. He married on 12 February 1930 Josephine Patricia McConnell, daughter of Sir Joseph McConnell, 2nd Baronet, who was his predecessor as MP for Antrim, and had two sons and a daughter.

References

External links
 The Peerage.com
 

1898 births
1945 deaths
British civilians killed in World War II
British Army personnel of World War I
Ulster Unionist Party members of the House of Commons of the United Kingdom
High Sheriffs of Antrim
Royal Artillery officers
Graduates of the Royal Military Academy, Woolwich
People educated at Lockers Park School
People educated at Wellington College, Berkshire
People from Randalstown
Members of the House of Commons of Northern Ireland 1938–1945
Members of the Parliament of the United Kingdom for County Antrim constituencies (since 1922)
UK MPs 1935–1945
Victims of aviation accidents or incidents in international waters
Victims of aviation accidents or incidents in 1945
Deputy Lieutenants of Belfast
Businesspeople from Northern Ireland
Members of the House of Commons of Northern Ireland for County Antrim constituencies
Politicians from County Antrim
Ulster Unionist Party members of the House of Commons of Northern Ireland